Akuapim North Municipal District is one of the thirty-three districts in Eastern Region, Ghana. Originally created as an ordinary district assembly in 1988 when it was known as Akuapim North District, which was created from the former Akuapim District Council; until it was elevated to municipal district assembly status on 15 March 2012 to become Akuapim North Municipal District. However on 15 March 2018, the northeast part of the district was split off to create Okere District; thus the remaining part has been retained as Akuapim North Municipal District. The municipality is located in the southeast part of Eastern Region and has Akropong as its capital town.

List of settlements

Sources
 
 Districts: Akuapim North Municipal District

References

Districts of the Eastern Region (Ghana)